István Jankovich (17 October 1889 – 21 February 1974) was a Hungarian track and field athlete of Slovak descent in the 1912 Summer Olympics.

He was born in Pozsony (present-day Bratislava) and died in Budapest. In 1912 he was eliminated in the semifinals of the 100 metres competition. He was also a member of the Hungarian team which was eliminated in the semifinals of the 4x100 metre relay competition.

References

External links
 
 

1889 births
1974 deaths
Sportspeople from Bratislava
Hungarian male sprinters
Slovak male sprinters
Olympic athletes of Hungary
Athletes (track and field) at the 1912 Summer Olympics